Stephan James may refer to either:

 Stephan James (actor) (born 1993), Canadian actor
 Stephan James (athlete) (born 1993), Guyanese athlete